Harry Maslin is an American record producer, recording/mixing engineer, and studio owner/designer.

In the mid-1970s, he engineered No. 1 hits for Barry Manilow ("Mandy"), and Dionne Warwick & The Spinners ("Then Came You"). As a producer, his chart hits include David Bowie's "Fame" (US No. 1) in 1975 and "Golden Years" (US No. 10) in 1976, and seven singles in the Top 5 for Air Supply from 1980–82, including "The One That You Love" (US No. 1).

Career

Philadelphia and New York
Harry Maslin was born and raised in Philadelphia, Pennsylvania, United States. He began his career in the 1960s by mixing live sound at the Electric Factory. There he mixed many leading acts, including Cream, The Jimi Hendrix Experience, Moby Grape, Ten Years After, BB King, Moody Blues, Buddy Guy, Grateful Dead, Hot Tuna, Procol Harum, The Chambers Brothers, Frank Zappa, and Janis Joplin. He began his recording career at Regent Sound Studios in Philadelphia, and later joined Regent's New York facility. There he expanded his knowledge, learning studio and console design, disc cutting, studio recording, mixing, and management. 

After two years at Regent, he moved to the Hit Factory Recording Studios as a chief recording engineer, where he engineered successful recordings by James Taylor, Bonnie Raitt, Carly Simon, Barry Manilow, and Dionne Warwick & The Spinners, among others. Hits he worked on included the album Barry Manilow II (US No. 9), and its US No. 1 single "Mandy"; Warwick & The Spinners' 1974 single "Then Came You" (US No. 1) (produced by Thom Bell), plus Carly Simon's Hotcakes album (US No. 3), and her single "Mockingbird" (US No. 5).

Maslin's career as a producer began at The Hit Factory, with the co-production of Bonnie Raitt's Streetlights album, he then moved to the Record Plant.

Bowie, Rollers, and Air Supply
From August to December 1974 David Bowie recorded his new Philly soul-inspired album at Philadelphia's Sigma Sound and New York's Record Plant. Producer Tony Visconti returned to London to mix the recordings, but Bowie took an opportunity to collaborate with John Lennon. Bowie called Maslin and asked the young engineer to produce. In January 1975 at Electric Lady studios Maslin oversaw the recording of "Fame" with Lennon on guest vocals, as well as a cover of Lennon's own song "Across the Universe". These sessions completed the hit album Young Americans. This album reached UK No. 2, US No. 9, and the single "Fame" was US No. 1.

Bowie asked Maslin to produce his next album, Station to Station, in Los Angeles in 1975. The album was a critical and commercial success, charting at US No. 3 and UK No. 5, and included the singles “Golden Years” and “TVC15”.

Maslin rejoined the Hit Factory and was next contacted by Clive Davis to produce two chart topper albums for the Bay City Rollers (including the 1977 hit single "You Made Me Believe in Magic" ), "Don't Cry Out Loud" a signature hit for Melissa Manchester in 1978, and an album for Eric Carmen in 1980. Davis then asked Maslin to take over production of the first Air Supply album for Arista Records, which achieved multi-platinum sales. He was called back to produce the following two multi-platinum albums for Air Supply, that were highlighted by five Top Five singles in a row "Even The Nights Are Better", "Every Woman In The World", "Here I Am", "Sweet Dreams", and "The One That You Love".

Los Angeles
In 1983, Maslin opened his own studio, Image Recording Studios in Hollywood. Maslin reduced his workload as a producer and engineer and focussed on studio management and consulting. Over the years, Image Recording Studios played host to mixer Chris Lord-Alge, Night Ranger, Madonna, Faith Hill, Henry Mancini, Quincy Jones, Guns N' Roses, Leonard Cohen, Tina Turner (including her hit single, "I Don't Want to Fight"), Carlene Carter, Fleetwood Mac, Ray Charles, Melissa Etheridge, No Doubt, Janet Jackson, Lisa Loeb, Goo Goo Dolls, Michelle Branch, Black Crowes, Cher, Sheryl Crow, Joe Cocker, Eric Clapton, Jewel, Butthole Surfers, Green Day (including their Grammy Record of the Year "Boulevard of Broken Dreams"), among others. Additionally, Image Recording mixed the music for many hit Hollywood movies including Lethal Weapon and The Hunt for Red October.

Among other engineering projects at Image Recording, Maslin worked on tracks for Jennifer Warren and Leonard Cohen, as well as Michael Jackson’s album HIStory.

Maslin has also served as a consultant for studio builders, equipment manufacturers, engineers, producers, A&R personnel, and music supervisors.

In 2005, Image Recording closed. Maslin has since built a digital ProTools studio for use by both himself and his producer/songwriter wife, Michele Vice-Maslin, and her company Sweetersongs.

In 2008, Maslin was again working with David Bowie mixing and re-mixing.

Personal life
Maslin is married to Emmy award-winning songwriter and producer Michèle Vice-Maslin.

Selective discography

As producer

Singles
 1977: "It's a Game" - Bay City Rollers (UK No. 16)
 1977: "You Made Me Believe in Magic" - Bay City Rollers (US No. 10, UK No. 34)
 1977: "The Way I Feel Tonight" - Bay City Rollers (US No. 24)
 1978: "Don't Cry Out Loud" - Melissa Manchester (US No. 10)
 1980: "It Hurts Too Much" - Eric Carmen (US No. 75)
 1980: "Lost in Love" - Air Supply (US No. 3)
 1980: "Every Woman in the World" - Air Supply (US No. 5)
 1981: "The One That You Love" - Air Supply (US No. 1)
 1981: "Here I Am" - Air Supply (US No. 5)
 1982: "Sweet Dreams" - Air Supply (US No. 5)
 1982: "Even the Nights Are Better" - Air Supply (US No. 5)

Albums
1975: Young Americans - David Bowie (US No. 9, UK No. 2)
1976: Station to Station - David Bowie (US No. 3, UK No. 5)
1976: Earl Slick Band - Earl Slick Band
1976: Hoppkorv - Hot Tuna
1977: It's a Game - Bay City Rollers (US No. 23, UK No. 16)
1978: Strangers in the Wind - Bay City Rollers (US No. 129)
1978: Don't Cry Out Loud - Melissa Manchester (US No. 33)
1980: Lost in Love - Air Supply (US No. 22)
1981: The One That You Love - Air Supply (US No. 10)
1982: Now and Forever - Air Supply (US No. 25)
2017: Live Nassau Coliseum '76 - David Bowie

References

Living people
American audio engineers
Record producers from Pennsylvania
Businesspeople from Philadelphia
Date of birth missing (living people)
Engineers from Pennsylvania
Year of birth missing (living people)